was a Japanese football player who played for and later managed the Japan national team.

Club career
Suzuki was born in Fukushima Prefecture on October 13, 1902. He was a founding member of the football team at Waseda University High School in 1921, and a founding member of the Waseda University football team in 1924. At Waseda, he played with many Japan national team players including Haruo Arima, Misao Tamai, Tamotsu Asakura, Shigeru Takahashi, Shojiro Sugimura, Nagayasu Honda, Ko Takamoro and Michiyo Taki.

National team career
In August 1927, Suzuki was selected Japan national team at the 1927 Far Eastern Championship Games in Shanghai. At this competition, on August 27, he debuted as captain against the Republic of China. On August 29, he also played and scored a goal against the Philippines, and Japan won this match, its first victory in an  International A Match. Suzuki played 2 games and scored 1 goal for Japan in 1927.

Coaching career
In 1930, Suzuki became manager for Japan national team for 1930 Far Eastern Championship Games in Tokyo. He led Japan to the champions. In 1936, he became manager for Japan again and managed at 1936 Summer Olympics in Berlin. Japan completed a come-from-behind victory against Sweden. The first victory in Olympics for the Japan and the historic victory over one of the powerhouses became later known as "Miracle of Berlin" (ベルリンの奇跡) in Japan. In 2016, this team was selected to the Japan Football Hall of Fame.

After World War II, Suzuki became an executive in the insurance industry. He died on December 20, 1971 at the age of 69. In 2007, he was selected to the Japan Football Hall of Fame.

National team statistics

References

External links
 
 Japan National Football Team Database
Japan Football Hall of Fame at Japan Football Association
Japan Football Hall of Fame (Japan team at 1936 Olympics) at Japan Football Association

1902 births
1971 deaths
Waseda University alumni
Association football people from Fukushima Prefecture
Japanese footballers
Japan international footballers
Japanese football managers
Japan national football team managers
Association football forwards